Eleni Kiosi (born ) is a Greek female volleyball player. She was part of the Greece women's national volleyball team.

She competed with the national team at the 2004 Summer Olympics in Athens, Greece. She played for Olympiacos and Iraklis Thessaloniki.

Clubs
  Olympiacos (2006–08)
  Iraklis Thessaloniki (2008–09)

See also
 Greece at the 2004 Summer Olympics

References

External links
profile at fivb

1985 births
Living people
Greek women's volleyball players
Olympiacos Women's Volleyball players
Place of birth missing (living people)
Volleyball players at the 2004 Summer Olympics
Olympic volleyball players of Greece
Volleyball players from Thessaloniki
21st-century Greek women